"Rosas" (English: "Roses") is a song performed by the Spanish pop group La Oreja de Van Gogh. It was written by Xabi San Martín and it was published by Sony BMG as the third single from the band's album Lo Que te Conté Mientras te Hacías la Dormida (2003). The song tells the story of the protagonist who sees her first love with another woman and remembers the moments they lived together for six months. At the same time, she narrates how she waits for him to arrive with roses every Friday in a place they frequented so they can continue with their relationship. The song peaked at number 5 on the Spanish Singles Chart. After its release, the song became one of the group's most popular songs.

Composition

"Rosas" is a torch pop song. It was written by Xabi San Martín, the keyboardist of La Oreja de Van Gogh. The lyrics narrate how the singer sees her first love with another woman as she remembers the moments they lived during their six-month relationship. At the same time, she narrates how every Friday she expects him to bring her roses while she waits in a place they frequented. When asked about the verse " / " ("And it is that I begin to think that true love is only the first one / And it is that I begin to suspect that the others are only for forgetting"), band members said that in perspective life looks different at age 20 than it does at age 45, although first love has an air of freshness to it that others do not have.

Reception
Jenny Gage highlighted the song in an album review. An editor of the Spanish radio station Happy FM described it as a "generational hymn" in which the listener easily identifies for its lyrical content and melodic tempo. At the same time, the writer perceived the refrain was ABBA-influenced. Andrea Mireille described Amaia Montero's vocals as "sweet and idyllic". At the 17th Annual Lo Nuestro Awards, "Rosas" was nominated Pop Song of the Year, but lost to "Que Lloro" by Sin Bandera. It was recognized as an award-winning song at the 2005 ASCAP Latin Awards in the rock category.

The song was covered by the Regional Mexican group Porte Diferente.

Charts

References

External links
 

2003 singles
2003 songs
La Oreja de Van Gogh songs
Torch songs